Hardup is a ghost town in Box Elder County, Utah, United States.

A Utah cartoonist has joked that the settlement "was apparently named by some cowboy without a girlfriend".

References

Ghost towns in Box Elder County, Utah
Ghost towns in Utah